Sunny Day is an animated children's television series produced by Silvergate Media. The following is a list of episodes.

Series overview

Episodes

Pilot (2016)

Season 1 (2017–2019)

Season 2 (2019–2020)
Silvergate renewed Sunny Day for a second season. According to The Hollywood Reporter, the second season will feature a new vehicle, Groom and Vroom, which was designed only on pets, in addition to the Glam Van. In addition, Lacey and KC will also join Sunny, Doodle, Rox, and Blair to help out for the joint.

Style Files
Style Files are a series of live-action tutorials provided by Sunny that involve the hairstyle featured at the end of every episode.

Notes

References

Sunny Day
Sunny Day
Sunny Day
Sunny Day